Sing Boy Sing is a 1958 album by American singer Tommy Sands. The album is the soundtrack to the film of the same name that stars Sands and Lili Gentle.

Track listing
 "I'm Gonna Walk and Talk with My Lord" (Martha Carson)
 "Who Baby" (Bill Olofson, Jeanne Carroll)
 "A Bundle of Dreams" (Billy Strange, Homer Escamilla)
 "Just a Little Bit More" (Charles Singleton, Rose Marie McCoy)
 "People In Love" (Lionel Newman, Mel Leven)
 "Crazy 'Cause I Love You" (Spade Cooley)
 "Your Daddy Wants to Do Right" (Tommy Sands)
 "That's All I Want From You" (Fritz Rotter)
 "Soda-Pop Pop" (Betty Daret, Darla Daret)
 "Would I Love You" (Bob Russell, Harold Spina)
 "Rock of Ages" (Augustus M. Toplady, Thomas Hastings)
 "Sing Boy Sing" (Rod McKuen, Sands)

Personnel
Tommy Sands – vocals
Lionel Newman – conductor

References

External links
 

1958 soundtrack albums
Capitol Records soundtracks
Tommy Sands (American singer) albums
Musical film soundtracks
Drama film soundtracks